Jackson Macrae (born 3 August 1994) is a professional Australian rules footballer playing for the Western Bulldogs in the Australian Football League (AFL). At 191 cm (6 ft 3in) tall and 85 kg (187 lb), he plays as a ball-winning midfielder who can play on the inside or as a running outside midfielder. He grew up in Kew, Victoria while attending Carey Baptist Grammar School, where he won the best and fairest award while playing for their top team. He played top-level junior football with the Oakleigh Chargers in the NAB League and Vic Metro in the AFL Under 18 Championships.

Macrae was drafted with the sixth selection in the 2012 AFL draft. He made his debut the following year in 2013. He received a nomination for the 2013 AFL Rising Star award in round 8 of the 2013 season. Since then, he has been an AFL Premiership player, three-time All-Australian midfielder, three-time Doug Hawkins Medallist, two-time Gary Dempsey Medallist and a Gary Ayres Medallist. He has polled a total of 95 Brownlow Medal votes in his career, and holds the all-time league record for most disposals in a season.

Early life and career
Macrae is the second son to father David and mother Rosie. He was a Hawthorn supporter growing up. He played junior football for the Kew Rovers in the Yarra Junior Football League.

Macrae attended secondary school at Carey Baptist Grammar School, with future AFL players such as Jack Viney and Nathan Hrovat.  Macrae was not selected to play for the Oakleigh Chargers in his bottom age year, meaning he had to continue playing school football. After having flown under the radar, excitement grew around Macrae after he began to rapidly improve. He hired former  player Ian Aitken to improve his kicking technique after he completed Year 11, which he said helped him become a 'more damaging kick'. While playing for his school, Carey Baptist Grammar School, he was coached by former North Melbourne player David King; under his guidance Macrae won the best and fairest for the team despite being around 4 future AFL draftees.

Macrae was selected to play for the Oakleigh Chargers in the NAB League in 2012, and quickly became an integral part of their team. While playing for the Chargers, Macrae averaged 24.5 disposals, 15.7 kicks, 8.8 handballs, 5.2 marks and 2.1 tackles out of his 12 games with the Chargers. Becoming one of the Chargers' best junior finals players, he was named as one of the team's best on ground in multiple finals. In Oakleigh's 46-point semi-finals win against the Dandenong Stingrays in September 2012, he was named as one of the team's best players that game. He was then named best on ground in the Chargers' 83-point preliminary final demolition of the North Ballarat Rebels, where he kicked 3 goals. Finally, he was named as the  most valuable player in the team's thrilling 1-point victory over the Gippsland Power in the grand final, where he kicked a crucial behind to secure the team's premiership trophy. He was named as the Oakleigh Chargers' best finals player, after averaging 28 disposals a game during the finals series, and came third in the club's best and fairest count with 68 votes, 15 votes away from obtaining first place.

He was also selected to play for Vic Metro in the AFL Under 18 Championships, where he played every game. He cemented his reputation as a dangerous player and boosted his draft chances after a six-goal game against Tasmania, including four goals in one quarter, claiming the best on ground title for that match. He averaged 19.4 disposals a game, at a 78.4% efficiency rate. Despite his consistent performances, he missed out on making the Under 18 All Australian team.

Macrae was predicted to be taken anywhere in the 2012 AFL draft between pick 6 and pick 13. He was recruited to the Bulldogs with the sixth selection in the 2012 AFL Draft, one pick behind future premiership forward Jake Stringer.

AFL career

2013–2015: Early career
Before debut, Macrae gained muscle and improved his fitness in order to improve his chances of selection, stating "You have to earn your right to play senior footy and first of all you have got to train well and prepare well." On his debut, Macrae kicked his first goal, and also collected 16 disposals, 4 tackles and 3 clearances. Despite being one of the youngest players in the match, Macrae was named as one of the Bulldogs' best on ground. In August of the 2013 season, Macrae signed a 3-year contract extension, keeping him at the Bulldogs until 2016. At the conclusion of the season, Macrae was presented with the Chris Grant Best First Year Player Award, after averaging 17.92 disposals throughout his 13 games that season.

Macrae's 2014 season was one of the best seasons by a second-year player in history, in contrast to the Bulldogs' mediocre 14th place season. Becoming a key part of the new Bulldogs' midfield, he recorded 25 or more disposals 15 times. He gathered 31 disposals, breaking his personal best from the 2013 season, and also got 2 goals, 7 marks and 3 tackles. He collected 30 disposals, 1 goal, 9 marks and 6 tackles. Macrae stamped his mark on the AFL in the ' 28-point victory against  in Round 17, becoming the youngest player to record 40 or more disposals in a game. Macrae gathered 43 disposals while kicking 2 goals, taking 6 marks and 5 tackles. Macrae was named best on ground, and received lots of praise for his effort. He also collected 1 goal, 7 marks and 4 tackles. Macrae was rewarded for his stellar second season with the Doug Hawkins Medal, awarded to the player who places runner up in the Western Bulldogs best and fairest voting. He collected 168 votes, 67 votes behind first-placed Tom Liberatore. He also claimed the Tony Liberatore Most Improved Player Award. He was named in the preliminary squad of the 22 Under 22 team, but narrowly missed out on making the team. Macrae also collected the highest number of Brownlow votes out of any Bulldog that season, with a total of ten. He picked up the maximum best on ground 3 votes twice, in Rounds 3 and 17, and picked up 2 votes twice in Rounds 12 and 18.

Macrae backed up his previous season with another solid season, averaging 26 disposals a game. With the Bulldogs making the finals for the first time since 2010, it was a year of improvement for both Macrae and the team. He collected 31 disposals and 8 marks in his impressive performance. In April that year, he signed a two-year contract extension alongside fellow 2012 draftee Jake Stringer, keeping him at the club until 2018. Despite averaging 21.3 disposals in the first 6 rounds of the season, and collecting 23 disposals the previous game, Macrae was omitted for the 7th and 8th rounds of the season. He was again kept out of the senior team in round 8, despite a 37 disposal, 6 tackle game for the reserves team the previous week. In his next game in the reserves he collected a game high 10 tackles and another above 30 disposal game, leading coach Luke Beveridge to put him back in the main side in the 9th round. His round 12 performance in the team's 72-point demolition of the  saw him collect his highest disposals count that season, a total of 35, while also getting 6 marks and 4 tackles. This dominant game saw him earn 3 Brownlow votes. He had one of his best performances for the season in the team's 22-point win against  in the 15th round of the season, after he collected 33 disposals, 1 goal,  2 behinds and 10 marks. In the match, he collected 30 disposals, 2 marks and 2 tackles. Macrae placed in 8th position in the Charles Sutton Medal, 76 votes behind first-placed Easton Wood. Macrae improved on his Brownlow performance slightly from the previous year, obtaining 11 votes, putting him at second place in the club and 27th overall. He picked up maximum votes twice, in Rounds 12 and 19, as well as 2 votes in rounds 14 and 15, and 1 vote in round 10.

2016–2017: Premiership glory
Macrae enjoyed another consistent season in 2016, averaging 27.6 disposals throughout his 22 games in the Bulldogs' fairytale season, where they broke a 62-year premiership drought from 7th place on the ladder. He never had under 20 disposals in a game that season, highlighting his consistency. He also contributed with 5 marks, 4 tackles and 3 inside 50s. He had two of his best games for the season in the 6th and 11th 2016 rounds respectively, getting 33 disposals in each game. He earned 1 Brownlow vote for his performance in Round 11, his only vote that season. In Round 12 he had a hamstring scare, but despite this managed to play the next week. Macrae tore a hamstring tendon in the ' 25-point loss against  in Round 19, a devastating blow for Macrae and the team, who were close to finals. In a battle against time to be fit for the finals, both he and teammate Tom Liberatore underwent an intensive rehabilitation program. Both players benefited from the newly introduced AFL pre-finals bye which gave them extra time to be deemed fit enough for selection in the Elimination Final against . Macrae and Liberatore were just two of five changes Beveridge made to the team and the risk paid off, with the Bulldogs upsetting the highly fancied Eagles by 47 points. Macrae would go on to become one of the Bulldogs' key players in their amazing finals campaign, averaging 30 disposals a game throughout the finals series. Macrae had his best game for the season in the ' 23-point victory against  in the semi-final, as he racked up 39 possessions and was influential in the Bulldogs' second-half demolition of a team they had previously never beaten in finals, and had not beaten since the 2010 season. He was named as one of the best on ground, behind Bulldogs star Marcus Bontempelli. In the thrilling preliminary final against , Macrae held his nerve to kick the winning set shot goal deep into the final quarter to get the Bulldogs into their first grand final since 1961. In the Grand Final, he was again among the Bulldogs' best with 33 disposals.

Macrae finished equal 7th in the Charles Sutton Medal voting with first-year player Caleb Daniel, with a total of 185 votes, 234 votes behind first-placed Marcus Bontempelli. He was named in the preliminary 22 Under 22 squad, but missed out on making the final 22.

The 2017 AFL season saw Macrae rapidly rise to the top of the Bulldogs midfield, improving his midfield work. He played every game of the season and averaged 27.5 disposals a game, while gathering 30 or more disposals in 8 games. In that game, he collected 29 disposals, 1 goal, 3 marks and 3 tackles. Macrae had a similarly good performance just two rounds later in Round 8, where he was named as one of the Bulldogs' best, collecting 32 disposals, 1 behind, 4 marks and 4 tackles. He took 32 disposals, a team high for that game, and also 5 marks and 4 tackles. By around halfway through the season, it was clear how much of an impact Macrae was having, touted as one of the team's most valuable players that season so far. He earned 2 Brownlow votes for that game. He was named again as one of the best in Round 20, collecting 32 disposals againast . Rounds 22 and 23 saw him pick up a combine 3 Brownlow votes, as he hit a purple patch towards the late end of the season. He hit his highest disposals count for the season after a best-on-team performance in the team's loss against  in Round 22,  collecting 41 disposals.

Macrae finished third in the Charles Sutton Medal voting for 2017, winning the Gary Dempsey medal awarded to third place in the Bulldogs' best and fairest voting. He tallied up a total of 155 votes, 30 behind back-to-back winner Marcus Bontempelli. He recorded 8 Brownlow votes, thrice getting 2 votes and getting 1 vote twice.
In November that year, Macrae signed a long term four-year contract, keeping him at the club until 2022.  After signing, Macrae stated: "I've loved playing for the club and am excited about what the future holds, I'm proud to be on the verge of being a 100-game player at the club, and motivated to continue to improve my game every season." List manager Brendan McCartney said "Jackson took his game to another level in 2017, and has become one of our most consistent performers, while he is already an important member of our midfield, he still has massive upside, and it's fantastic to see him recommit for the long term."

2018–2019: Maiden All-Australian

Macrae stood up for his team in 2018, moving into the elite category of footballers. He got named as the best Bulldog on ground in his 100th game against  in Round 1 of the 2018 AFL season. He gathered 31 disposals, 1 behind, 5 marks and 6 tackles. Macrae had close to his best game for the season in Round 2, where the Bulldogs were outdone by a formidable Eagles team by 51-points. In that game he collected a match-high 31 disposals, as well as 3 goals, 6 marks and 4 tackles. He had two impressive back to back perfromrnaces in Rounds 7 and 8, getting a combine total of 87 disposals in those two games. Round 7 saw him have an excellent game against , where he totalled 40 disposals and got named best on ground. He was given three Brownlow Medal votes for his performance. Then in Round 8, Macrae broke his career record of disposals in a single match, collecting an incredible 47 disposals in the team's 14-point win against . He was once again named best on ground and received another 3 Brownlow votes. These performances boosted his reputation as one of the AFL's best midfielders, gaining attention and praise from the media. He broke his record for most tackles in the next game with 13 tackles, a game high which saw him get named as the Bulldogs' best player on ground for the third game in a row. He returned to the team in Round 17, and collected 33 disposals in his first game back, which saw him named as the Bulldogs' best. Macrae's performance in the final round of the season was one of his best, kicking a goal and gathering 43 disposals in a dominant performance against , which saw the Bulldog's narrowly lose. This performance saw him nab all 3 Brownlow votes for the third time that season.

Macrae was named in the preliminary squad of the 2018 All-Australian team, but missed out on making the final squad, which many considered unlucky due to his incredible performance all year. Macrae received the Doug Hawkins medal for the second time in his career after placing just 1 vote behind Lachie Hunter in the Western Bulldogs Charles Sutton Medal voting, tallying 190 votes over 19 games that season. He also won the John Van Groningen Domestique award for 2018, awarded to the player who places the team above themselves in games. Macrae secured 14 votes in the 2018 Brownlow Medal, placing equal-19th in the count.

Macrae had his most successful season to date in 2019 being selected in the All-Australian team and being placed high in the Brownlow Medal count at the end of the year. The pre-season saw him work hard to improve his skillset, stating "I pride myself on my performance year-in, year-out and there's still so many areas for myself to improve which is really exciting," Macrae had 36 disposals and a goal in the second round of the year, which saw the  pull off a major comeback in the final quarter to defeat . He earned 3 brownlow votes for his performance. Apart from a 36 disposal performance against  in Round 7, he had a relatively quiet start to the season. He earned two Brownlow votes in this game. Round 19 saw Macrae as one of the finest players in his team, taking 38 disposals, 7 marks, 5 tackles and 8 clearances, which resulted in him being given two Brownlow Medal votes for that match. This game would see him kickstart a run of five consecutive Brownlow vote winning performances, greatly pushing him into Brownlow Medal contention. He also collected 4 marks, 7 tackles and 12 clearances. He kicked 1 goal, and collected 38 disposals, 2 marks and 8 tackles. Round 22 saw him earn another 3 Brownlow medal votes, after he tallied up 39 disposals, his 10th consecutive time getting 30 or more disposals in a game. In that game, he also collected 1 mark, 3 tackles and 7 clearances. Another outstanding performance in Round 23 saw Macrae earn back-to-back best on ground honours, securing another 3 Brownlow Medal votes. The 34-point win over  saw Macrae collect 1 goal, 35 disposals, 4 marks and 8 clearances.

Macrae won a plethora of awards at the season's conclusion. He was awarded with his maiden All-Australian team honour, alongside teammate Marcus Bontempelli. The AFL player ratings system saw Macrae ranked as the 10th best player in the entire competition. He was named in the Herald Sun's top 50 players for 2019 with All-Australian teammate Bontempelli and young gun Josh Dunkley. He earned a career-high 22 votes in the 2019 Brownlow Medal, placing equal eighth in the count with teammate Marcus Bontempelli. Macrae also got his third top-place finish for the 3rd season in a row, winning the Gary Dempsey Medal with a total of 268 votes, 31 behind 1st placed Marcus Bontempelli. He also led the league for most disposals averaged per game, averaging 33.4 disposals over his 23 games that season.

2020–: Continued success
The 2020 AFL season was another successful one for Macrae, who averaged 26.39 disposals a game even with shortened quarters. He participated in the State of Origin for Bushfire Relief Match, playing on the Victorian team with teammate Marcus Bontempelli and against teammate Jason Johannisen. He wore the same number as his Bulldogs jersey, number 11. He also collected 5 marks and a game-high 7 tackles. He had 29 disposals, 2 marks, 2 tackles and 4 clearances. Macrae had his second best on ground performance for the year against  in Round 8, racking up 29 disposals, 2 marks, 6 tackles and 7 clearances. He gathered 37 disposals, the highest in the game and the equal second highest for the season, as well as 2 marks, 4 tackles and 4 clearances. Round 11 saw Macrae receive only 2 Brownlow votes, despite setting the record in the 2020 AFL season for most disposals in a single game, tallying up 40. While he did not receive the 3 best on ground votes, which were awarded to Lachie Neale, he did receive 2. He also kicked 1 goal, and had 4 marks, 4 tackles and 3 clearances. His Round 16 performance against  was also impressive, earning him two Brownlow votes. He racked up 29 disposals, 2 marks, 3 tackles and 5 clearances. Despite this, he still had the third-most disposals out of anyone on his team.

Once again, Macrae amassed a number of awards at the season's end. He was selected for his second All-Australian team in a row, this time named on the wing. He polled 15 votes in the 2020 Brownlow Medal, placing equal 5th with other stars like Patrick Dangerfield, Luke Parker, and Dustin Martin. Despite polling the most votes out of any Bulldog in the Brownlow Medal count, Macrae placed 4th in the Charles Sutton Medal count with 154 votes, 51 votes behind first-placed Caleb Daniel.

Macrae began the 2021 AFL season in good form, collecting 35 and 41 disposals in his first two games, and being named in the Bulldogs' best in both matches. A 32 disposals, 1 goal round 4 performance against  saw him again be named one of the team's best, nabbing 9 coaches votes to place him at equal-second in the count up to that point. Macrae obtained coaches votes in every single round up to and including Round 6, after a dominant Round 6 performance with 40 disposals, a goal and 8 inside 50s securing him 8 votes. Macrae drew praise from his coach Luke Beveridge after his dominant early season display, where he stated "Jack has had his best start to any season since I've been the senior coach". Macrae became just the second player ever to collect 30 or more disposals in the first 8 rounds of the season, the only other player being David Thorpe in 1971. After Macrae collected 31 disposals in round 16 against , he set the all-time record for most consecutive 30-disposal games in VFL/AFL history, with 15 in a row. Macrae performed strongly in the Western Bulldogs' finals campaign, winning the Gary Ayres Award as best player throughout the finals series.

Statistics
 Statistics are correct to the end of the 2022 season.

|- 
! scope="row" style="text-align:center" | 2013
|
| 11 || 13 || 3 || 1 || 100 || 133 || 233 || 35 || 35 || 0.2 || 0.1 || 7.7 || 10.2 || 17.9 || 2.7 || 2.7 || 0
|-
! scope="row" style="text-align:center" | 2014
|
| 11 || 21 || 9 || 5 || 302 || 260 || 562 || 119 || 86 || 0.4 || 0.2 || 14.4 || 12.4 || 26.8 || 5.7 || 4.1 || 10
|- 
! scope="row" style="text-align:center" | 2015
|
| 11 || 21 || 5 || 6 || 287 || 267 || 554 || 97 || 117 || 0.2 || 0.3 || 13.7 || 12.7 || 26.4 || 4.6 || 5.6 || 11
|-
| scope=row bgcolor=F0E68C | 2016# 
|
| 11 || 22 || 2 || 4 || 271 || 336 || 607 || 104 || 96 || 0.1 || 0.2 || 12.3 || 15.3 || 27.6 || 4.7 || 4.4 || 1
|- 
! scope="row" style="text-align:center" | 2017
|
| 11 || 22 || 2 || 5 || 260 || 345 || 605 || 100 || 127 || 0.1 || 0.2 || 11.8 || 15.7 || 27.5 || 4.5 || 5.8 || 8
|-
! scope="row" style="text-align:center" | 2018
|
| 11 || 19 || 8 || 5 || 299 || 324 || 623 || 110 || 102 || 0.4 || 0.3 || 15.7 || 17.1 || 32.8 || 5.8 || 5.4 || 14
|-  
! scope="row" style="text-align:center" | 2019
|
| 11 || 23 || 5 || 2 || 342 || 425 || 767 || 101 || 120 || 0.2 || 0.1 || 14.9 || 18.5 || bgcolor=CAE1FF | 33.4† || 4.4 || 5.2 || 22
|-
! scope="row" style="text-align:center" | 2020
|
| 11 || 18 || 3 || 3 || 206 || bgcolor=CAE1FF | 269† || 475 || 50 || 71 || 0.2 || 0.2 || 11.4 || 15.0 || 26.4 || 2.8 || 3.9 || 15
|-  
! scope="row" style="text-align:center" | 2021
|
| 11 || 26 || 6 || 4 || 435 || bgcolor=CAE1FF | 445† || bgcolor=CAE1FF | 880† || 102 || 128 || 0.2 || 0.2 || 16.7 || 17.1 || 33.8 || 3.9 || 4.9 || 14
|-
! scope="row" style="text-align:center" | 2022
|
| 11 || 23 || 4 || 4 || 342 || 363 || 705 || 96 || 87 || 0.2 || 0.2 || 14.9 || 15.8 || 30.7 || 4.2 || 3.8 || 11
|- class="sortbottom"
! colspan=3| Career
! 208
! 47
! 39
! 2844
! 3167
! 6011
! 914
! 969
! 0.2
! 0.2
! 13.7
! 15.2
! 28.9
! 4.4
! 4.7
! 106
|}

Notes

Personal life
Macrae is in a relationship with Louisa Macleod, who he took to the 2017 Brownlow Medal presentation night. Macrae's father, David Macrae, died on 21 February 2021.

Macrae appeared in an advertising campaign for McDonalds that began airing on television throughout the early months of 2021. He has done charity work with Team Ladder, an official AFL player charity which works on using the power of players and industry to help improve the lives of young people.

Honours and achievements
AFL
Team
AFL premiership: 2016
Individual
All-Australian team: 2019, 2020, 2021
Doug Hawkins Medal: 2014, 2018, 2021
Gary Ayres Award: 2021
Gary Dempsey Medal: 2017, 2019
John van Groningen Domestique Award: 2018
Tony Liberatore Most Improved Player Award: 2014
Chris Grant Best First Year Player Award: 2013
AFL Rising Star nominee: 2013
TAC Cup
Team
TAC Cup premiers & Best on Ground - Oakleigh Chargers: 2012

References

External links

 Match ratings from Inside Football

1994 births
Living people
Western Bulldogs players
Western Bulldogs Premiership players
Oakleigh Chargers players
Australian rules footballers from Melbourne
People educated at Carey Baptist Grammar School
All-Australians (AFL)
One-time VFL/AFL Premiership players
People from Kew, Victoria